Tarqui may refer to:
 Tarqui, Huila, Colombia
 Tarqui, Cuenca Canton, Ecuador
 Tarqui, Guayaquil Canton, Ecuador
 Tarqui, Pastaza Canton, Ecuador